Platinum coins are a form of currency. Platinum has an international currency symbol under ISO 4217 of XPT. The issues of legitimate platinum coins were initiated by Spain in Spanish-colonized America in the 18th century and continued by the Russian Empire in the 19th century. As a form of currency, these coins proved to be impractical: platinum resembles many less expensive metals, and, unlike the more malleable and ductile silver and gold, it is very difficult to work. Several commemorative coin sets have been issued starting from 1978 and became popular among coin collectors. The major platinum bullion coins include the American Platinum Eagle, the Canadian Platinum Maple Leaf, the Australian Platinum Koala, the Isle of Man Noble, the Chinese Platinum Panda, the Austrian Vienna Philharmonic and several series by the Soviet Union and later by the Russian Federation.

History
Platinum was first used for minting coins in Spanish-colonized America. Following the discovery of platinum in gold rocks, the Spaniards were unable to use it for a long time because they had no technology for processing this metal. The then-cheap platinum was used for various kinds of frauds, such as substituting it for the more expensive silver. After the discovery that platinum alloys with gold, counterfeiters began to add it to gold coins. The platinum confiscated from counterfeiters was likely thrown into the sea, in accordance with the royal decree of 1735, however this is not confirmed, and it may be that only a few kilos were ever thrown into rivers. Later, the practice of adding platinum to gold as a ligature was adopted by the authorities in Spain in order to lower the gold content of coins. Also in Spain, in the mid-19th century, counterfeiters began producing British Sovereigns out of a gold-plated alloy of platinum and copper, relying on a similar specific weight of platinum and gold.

In 1814, the United States struck a pattern half dollar in platinum.

In the late 1820s, the British Royal Mint produced several trial coins as part of experiments on the use of platinum in coins. One of these coins has the same diameter as a farthing and a weak relief owing to the high hardness of platinum. The 1812 Pattern 9 Pence Bank Token (S3773A) was used for the obverse and the farthing of 1825 for the reverse parts of this coin. No dies were manufactured for these experiments, so expired dies of the corresponding coins were used instead. Coins minted using dies from two different coins are called mules. The coin bears the year of 1825, but was likely printed at a later date. Like all test coins, the platinum farthing has a high historic and numismatic value. This coin is also interesting because it features the portrait of the already deceased monarch George III (1738–1820).

The only case when platinum coins were used as a regular national currency was in Russia, where coins were circulated between 1828 and 1845. These coins proved to be impractical: platinum resembles many less expensive metals, and, unlike the more malleable and ductile silver and gold, it is very difficult to work. However, merchants valued platinum coins because it did not melt in fires like gold or silver. The minting of platinum coins resumed only after 130 years. Between 1977 and 1980, in preparation for the 1980 Summer Olympics, the Soviet Union produced five commemorative coin sets, and since 1988 commemorative platinum coins were issued every year. The practice of regularly issuing platinum coins has continued in modern Russia, and since 1992 the Central Bank of Russia has released 16 sets of platinum coins.

Since 1983, other countries have begun regular minting of platinum coins. The most notable examples are the Platinum cat, and Platinum Noble by the Isle of Man, Canadian Platinum Maple Leaf, Chinese Platinum Panda and Australian Platinum Koala.

Platinum coin series
Several other countries have issued platinum coins, but only as bullion coins. These coins are considered serial because the design of the reverse and obverse is the same or similar for all the coins of a given year. In addition to similarities in design, these coins are combined in the series because they are issued annually for a period of time. For example, the Platinum Panda was produced from 1987 to 2005, and the American Platinum Eagle from 1997 to 2008.

Single issues

Many commemorative coins were dedicated to a significant event or anniversary and issued only once. For example, Estonia released a platinum coin in 2008 to honor its 90th anniversary, and Tonga issued 400 platinum coins in 1967 for the coronation of Taufa'ahau Tupou IV. Other countries that have minted commemorative platinum coins include Bulgaria, Congo, Panama, South Africa, Portugal and France.

The Estonian issue began on 24 February 2008 – Independence Day – and included silver, gold and platinum coins. The platinum coin was a first for Estonia. Its reverse featured a barn swallow – the national symbol of Estonia – and the obverse showed the national coat of arms. The coin had a face value of 100 Estonian kroons, a platinum purity of 999/1000, a weight of 7.775 grams, and a diameter of 18.0 mm. The coin was designed by Tiit Jϋrna and produced by the Mint of Finland with a quantity of 3,000 pieces. The opening sale took place in the Hall of Independence at the National Bank, where the independence of Estonia was proclaimed 90 years ago; 349 coins and 176 sets were sold within three and a half hours. The entire issue is now sold out.

Investing in coins and their storage
Platinum coins are a popular investment, and each year the number of such coins sold by Sberbank of Russia increases by 30–50%. Most experts agree that such investments should have a long-term character, as the rise of the platinum price is relatively slow – about 80% over the last 5 years, except for a rapid rise followed by decline in 2008. Also, whereas most banks can sell platinum coins, only a few buy them, as this requires evaluation by an experienced professional. For example, only 5% of offices of Sberbank (the major bank of Russia) in the capital city of Moscow redeem precious metal coins. The selling price is also much affected by visible scratches, spots, patina, and other defects introduced by bad handling. For this reason, most bullion coins are sealed in transparent plastic right after removal from the press. They are then stored in a dry room with relative humidity below 80% and at temperatures between 15 and 40 °C. If a coin is removed from its plastic seal, it is recommended not to store it in PVC albums, as PVC molecules gradually break down, releasing organochlorine compounds which produce patina on the coins. These compounds may also form acids by reacting with moisture. Unlike silver, platinum does not corrode. However, as is true for all unprotected coins, platinum coins are prone to contamination which can be caused even by washing with (chlorine-containing) tap water.

See also

 Platinum coins of Russia:
 Platinum coins of the Russian Empire
 Platinum coins of the Soviet Union
 Platinum coins of the Russian Federation
 Precious metal coins
 Gold coin
 Silver coin
 Palladium coin
 Platinum as an investment
 Trillion-dollar coin
 1814 platinum half dollar

References

Bibliography

External links
 American Platinum Eagle images

Bullion coins
 
Platinum
Platinum objects